Dean Renfro (June 15, 1932 – November 11, 2012) was an American football halfback. He played for the Baltimore Colts in 1955 and for the Calgary Stampeders from 1956 to 1957.

He died on November 11, 2012, in Plano, Texas at age 80.

References

1932 births
2012 deaths
American football halfbacks
North Texas Mean Green football players
Baltimore Colts players
Calgary Stampeders players